Sainte-Thérèse station is a commuter rail station operated by Exo in Sainte-Thérèse, Quebec, Canada. It is served by  the Saint-Jérôme line, as well as RTM buses.

The station is located in ARTM fare zone C, and currently has 680 parking spaces. Prior to the reform of the ARTM's fare structure in July 2022, it was in zone 5.

At the time the intermodal terminal opened, it was owned by the city of Sainte-Thérèse, but operated and maintained by the former Agence Métropolitaine de transport (AMT). The RTM assumed operation on June 1, 2017. 
The station's design was influenced by the Pianos Lesage building, a former piano factory in Sainte-Thérèse. A farmers' market is nearby.

Connecting bus routes

References

External links
  Sainte-Thérèse Commuter Train Station Information (RTM)
 Sainte-Thérèse Commuter Train Station Schedule (RTM)
Limocar urban transport

Exo commuter rail stations
Exo bus stations
Railway stations in Laurentides
Railway stations in Canada opened in 1997
1997 establishments in Quebec
Sainte-Thérèse, Quebec